Agaraea internervosa is a moth of the family Erebidae. It was described by Paul Dognin in 1912. It is found in Colombia.

References

Moths described in 1912
Phaegopterina
Moths of South America